Matt Gordon (born 1969) is a Canadian actor, perhaps best known for playing Doc in the sports sitcom Rent-a-Goalie, and for his portrayal of Officer Oliver Shaw in the drama series Rookie Blue.

Filmography

Awards

References

External links

1969 births
Canadian male film actors
Living people
Date of birth missing (living people)
Place of birth missing (living people)